Glenmorgan may refer to:

Australia
 Glenmorgan, Queensland
 Glenmorgan railway line

India
 Glenmorgan, Ooty

United States
 Glen Morgan, West Virginia